1,4-Dioxane is a heterocyclic organic compound, classified as an ether. It is a colorless liquid with a faint sweet odor similar to that of diethyl ether.  The compound is often called simply dioxane because the other dioxane isomers (1,2- and 1,3-) are rarely encountered.

Dioxane is used as a solvent for a variety of practical applications as well as in the laboratory, and also as a stabilizer for the transport of chlorinated hydrocarbons in aluminum containers.

Synthesis 
Dioxane is produced by the acid-catalysed dehydration of diethylene glycol, which in turn is obtained from the hydrolysis of ethylene oxide.

In 1985, the global production capacity for dioxane was between 11,000 and 14,000 tons. In 1990, the total U.S. production volume of dioxane was between 5,250 and 9,150 tons.

Structure 
The dioxane molecule is centrosymmetric, meaning that it adopts a chair conformation, typical of relatives of cyclohexane. However, the molecule is conformationally flexible, and the boat conformation is easily adopted, e.g. in the chelation of metal cations.
Dioxane resembles a smaller crown ether with only two ethyleneoxyl units.

Uses

Trichloroethane transport 
In the 1980s, most of the dioxane produced was used as a stabilizer for 1,1,1-trichloroethane for storage and transport in aluminium containers. Normally aluminium is protected by a passivating oxide layer, but when these layers are disturbed, the metallic aluminium reacts with trichloroethane to give aluminium trichloride, which in turn catalyses the dehydrohalogenation of the remaining trichloroethane to vinylidene chloride and hydrogen chloride. Dioxane "poisons" this catalysis reaction by forming an adduct with aluminum trichloride.

As a solvent 

Dioxane is used in a variety of applications as a versatile aprotic solvent, e. g. for inks, adhesives, and cellulose esters. It is substituted for tetrahydrofuran (THF) in some processes, because of its lower toxicity and higher boiling point (101 °C, versus 66 °C for THF).

While diethyl ether is rather insoluble in water, dioxane is miscible and in fact is hygroscopic.  At standard pressure, the mixture of water and dioxane in the ratio 17.9:82.1 by mass is a positive azeotrope that boils at 87.6 C.

The oxygen atoms are weakly Lewis-basic. It  forms adducts with a variety of Lewis acids. It is classified as a hard base and its base parameters in the ECW model are EB =1.86 and CB = 1.29. 

Dioxane produces coordination polymers by linking metal centers.   In this way, it is used to drive the Schlenk equilibrium,allowing the synthesis of dialkyl magneium compounds. Dimethylmagnesium is prepared in this manner:
2 CHMgBr + (CHO) → MgBr(CHO) + (CH)Mg

Spectroscopy 
Dioxane is used as an internal standard for nuclear magnetic resonance spectroscopy in deuterium oxide.

Toxicology

Safety 
It is irritating to the eyes and respiratory tract. Exposure may cause damage to the central nervous system, liver and kidneys. In a 1978 mortality study conducted on workers exposed to 1,4-dioxane, the observed number deaths from cancer was not significantly different from the expected number. Dioxane is classified by the National Toxicology Program as "reasonably anticipated to be a human carcinogen". It is also classified by the IARC as a Group 2B carcinogen: possibly carcinogenic to humans because it is a known carcinogen in other animals. The United States Environmental Protection Agency classifies dioxane as a probable human carcinogen (having observed an increased incidence of cancer in controlled animal studies, but not in epidemiological studies of workers using the compound), and a known irritant (with a no-observed-adverse-effects level of 400 milligrams per cubic meter) at concentrations significantly higher than those found in commercial products. Under California Proposition 65, dioxane is classified in the U.S. State of California to cause cancer. Animal studies in rats suggest that the greatest health risk is associated with inhalation of vapors in the pure form. The State of New York has adopted a first-in-the-nation drinking water standard for 1,4-Dioxane and set the maximum contaminant level of 1 part per billion.

It tends to concentrate in the water and has little affinity for soil. It is resistant to abiotic degradation in the environment, and was formerly thought to also resist biodegradation. However, more recent studies since the 2000s have found that it can be biodegraded through a number of pathways, suggesting that bioremediation can be used to treat 1,4-dioxane contaminated water.

Explosion hazard 
Like some other ethers, dioxane combines with atmospheric oxygen upon prolonged exposure to air to form potentially explosive peroxides. Distillation of these mixtures is dangerous. Storage under metallic sodium could limit the risk of explosion.

Environment 
Dioxane has affected groundwater supplies in several areas. Dioxane at the level of 1 μg/L (~1 ppb) has been detected in many locations in the US. In the U.S. state of New Hampshire, it had been found at 67 sites in 2010, ranging in concentration from 2 ppb to over 11,000 ppb. Thirty of these sites are solid waste landfills, most of which have been closed for years. In 2019, the Southern Environmental Law Center successfully sued Greensboro, North Carolina's Wastewater treatment after 1,4-Dioxane was found at 20 times above EPA safe levels in the Haw River.

Cosmetics 
As a byproduct of the ethoxylation process, a route to some ingredients found in cleansing and moisturizing products, dioxane can contaminate cosmetics and personal care products such as deodorants, perfumes, shampoos, toothpastes and mouthwashes. The ethoxylation process makes the cleansing agents, such as sodium laureth sulfate and ammonium laureth sulfate, less abrasive and offers enhanced foaming characteristics. 1,4-Dioxane is found in small amounts in some cosmetics, a yet unregulated substance used in cosmetics in both China and the U.S. Research has found the chemical in ethoxylated raw ingredients and in off-the-shelf cosmetic products. The Environmental Working Group (EWG) found that 97% of hair relaxers, 57% of baby soaps and 22 percent of all products in Skin Deep, their database for cosmetic products, are contaminated with 1,4-dioxane.

Since 1979 the U.S. Food and Drug Administration (FDA) have conducted tests on cosmetic raw materials and finished products for the levels of 1,4-dioxane. 1,4-Dioxane was present in ethoxylated raw ingredients at levels up to 1410 ppm (~0.14%wt), and at levels up to 279 ppm (~0.03%wt) in off the shelf cosmetic products. Levels of 1,4-dioxane exceeding 85 ppm (~0.01%wt) in children's shampoos indicate that close monitoring of raw materials and finished products is warranted. While the FDA encourages manufacturers to remove 1,4-dioxane, it is not required by federal law.

On 9 December 2019, New York passed a bill to ban the sale of cosmetics with more than 10 ppm of 1,4-dioxane as of the end of 2022. The law will also prevent the sale of household cleaning and personal care products containing more than 2 ppm of 1,4-dioxane at the end of 2022.

See also 

 Dioxolane
 9-crown-3
 Dioxane tetraketone
 Oxalic anhydride
 Dioxanone

References 

Dioxanes
Ether solvents
IARC Group 2B carcinogens
Crown ethers
Sweet-smelling chemicals